Andrew Cecil "Scrappy" Moore Jr. (September 25, 1902 – May 31, 1971) was an American football player and coach and college athletics administrator.  He served as the head football coach at the University of Chattanooga, now the University of Tennessee at Chattanooga, from 1931 to 1967, compiling a record of 170–148–14.  He had the longest tenure and the most successful record of any coach at Chattanooga.  Moore played football as a quarterback at the University of Georgia.  Moore's nickname "Scrappy" is currently used as the name of the mascot of UTC.  He was inducted into the College Football Hall of Fame as a coach in 1980.

Moore died on  May 31, 1971, in Chattanooga, Tennessee.

Head coaching record

References

1902 births
1971 deaths
American football drop kickers
American football quarterbacks
Chattanooga Mocs athletic directors
Chattanooga Mocs football coaches
Georgia Bulldogs football players
College Football Hall of Fame inductees
Sportspeople from Chattanooga, Tennessee